Bows + Arrows is the second album by The Walkmen, released in 2004 (see 2004 in music). The album was self-produced aside from one song, "The Rat," produced by Dave Sardy. The album received a great deal of critical acclaim, appearing on several critics' year-end lists.

"Little House of Savages" and "What's in It for Me" were both included on hit FOX teen drama The O.C. "The Rat" was named Pitchforks #6 single of the year. "The Rat" was selected for the playlist on the video game Major League Baseball 2K7.

"The Rat" was listed at #20 on Pitchforks top 500 songs of the 2000s and at #13 on NMEs top 100 songs of the 2000s.

Track listing
All songs written by The Walkmen.
 "What's in It for Me" – 2:53
 "The Rat" – 4:27
 "No Christmas While I'm Talking" – 4:30
 "Little House of Savages" – 3:15
 "My Old Man" – 4:46
 "138th Street" – 3:02
 "The North Pole" – 3:48
 "Hang On, Siobhan" – 3:45
 "New Year's Eve" – 2:20
 "Thinking of a Dream I Had" – 4:33
 "Bows + Arrows" – 5:16

Personnel 
 Hamilton Leithauser – vocals, guitars
 Paul Maroon – guitars, piano
 Walter Martin – organ, pandemonium
 Peter Bauer – bass
 Matt Barrick – drums

Singles
 "The Rat" (April 19, 2004)
 US 7" vinyl: "The Rat" / "Clementine"
 "Little House of Savages" (June 28, 2004)
 UK CD1: "Little House of Savages" / "Fly into Mystery"
 UK CD2: "Little House of Savages" / "Wake Up" / "Revenge Wears No Wristwatch" / "Little House of Savages" (enhanced video)

References

The Walkmen albums
Albums produced by Dave Sardy
2004 albums
Record Collection albums